The FIBT World Championships 1969 took place in Lake Placid, New York, United States for the third time, hosting the event previously in 1949, and 1961. This also marked the first time both events were able to be competed since 1965.

Two man bobsleigh

Four man bobsleigh

Medal table

References
2-Man bobsleigh World Champions
4-Man bobsleigh World Champions

1967
1969 in American sports
International sports competitions hosted by the United States
Sports in Lake Placid, New York
1969 in bobsleigh
1969 in sports in New York (state)
Bobsleigh in the United States